Papua New Guinea competed at the 2000 Summer Olympics in Sydney, Australia.

Results by event

Athletics
Men's 400 m hurdles
Mowen Boino
 Round 1 – 51.38 (did not advance)

Women's 400 m
Ann Mooney
 Round 1 – 55.55 (did not advance)

Swimming
Men's 100m Breaststroke
Kieran Chan
 Preliminary Heat – 01:13.34 (did not advance)

Women's 100 m breaststroke
Xenia Peni
 Preliminary Heat – 01:19.62 (did not advance)

Weightlifting

Women's 48 kg category
Dika Toua
 Finished in 10th Place (Total 117.5 kg = Snatch 50 kg + C&J 67.5 kg)

See also
 Papua New Guinea at the 2000 Summer Paralympics

References
Wallechinsky, David (2004). The Complete Book of the Summer Olympics (Athens 2004 Edition). Toronto, Canada. . 
International Olympic Committee (2001). The Results. Retrieved 12 November 2005.
Sydney Organising Committee for the Olympic Games (2001). Official Report of the XXVII Olympiad Volume 1: Preparing for the Games. Retrieved 20 November 2005.
Sydney Organising Committee for the Olympic Games (2001). Official Report of the XXVII Olympiad Volume 2: Celebrating the Games . Retrieved 20 November 2005.
Sydney Organising Committee for the Olympic Games (2001). The Results . Retrieved 20 November 2005.
International Olympic Committee Web Site

Nations at the 2000 Summer Olympics
2000
Olympics